Jamie Martin may refer to:

Males 
Jamie Martin (American football) (born 1970), American football player
Jamie Martin (All My Children), a fictional character of All My Children
Jamie Martin, an actor in Consenting Adults

Females 
 Jamie Martin, a radio personality on KAJA
 Jamie Martin, a character in Safe Harbor, portrayed by Chyler Leigh

See also
James Martin (disambiguation)